Laagri (Estonian for "Camp") is a subdistrict in the district of Nõmme, Tallinn, the capital of Estonia. It is the southernmost subdistrict of Tallinn.

Laagri has a station on the Elron western route.

Gallery

References

Subdistricts of Tallinn